Etlingera heyniana is a monocotyledonous plant species first described by Theodoric Valeton and given its current name by Rosemary Margaret Smith.  Etlingera heyniana is part of the genus Etlingera and the family Zingiberaceae.

The range of the species is Java. No subspecies are listed in the Catalog of Life.

References 

heyniana
Taxa named by Rosemary Margaret Smith